Mustapha Alasan Jarju (born 18 July 1986), also known as Toubabo, is a Gambian former footballer.

Club career
Mustapha Jarju began his career playing with Reggae Boys, Racing Star, Steve Biko FC and Wallidan in his native Gambia. Jarju would launch his international club career with Belgian club Lierse. In his two years at the club Jarju was a prominent member of the side scoring 24 goals in 62 matches.

As a result of his stellar play with Lierse, Jarju signed with R.A.E.C. Mons in 2008. While with Mons he appeared in 99 league matches and scored 34 goals. His best season with Mons was during the 2010/11 campaign in which he scored 18 goals in 31 league matches, helping the club gain promotion to the Belgian top flight. In total with the club Jarju appeared in 106 official matches and scored 37 goals.

He would become the first African to sign as a Designated Player in Major League Soccer after signing with the Vancouver Whitecaps FC on 12 July 2011. However, it was not a good fit for Jarju, with Vancouver mutually agreeing to terminate his contract on 20 January 2012.

Jarju re-signed with R.A.E.C. Mons on 25 January 2012.

In July 2015, Jarju signed for Kazakhstan Premier League side Irtysh Pavlodar. Jarju terminated his contract with Irtysh in September of the same year, without playing for the club, before filing a lawsuit against the club over unpaid wages and compensation.

International career
The midfielder was previously the captain of the U-17 and U-20 national teams, as well as serving as alternate captain for Gambia and scoring a goal for the national squad versus Liberia in the 2010 World Cup qualification first round.

International goals
Scores and results list Gambia's goal tally first.

References

External links

thepoint.gm

1986 births
Living people
Gambian footballers
Gambian expatriate footballers
The Gambia international footballers
The Gambia youth international footballers
Lierse S.K. players
R.A.E.C. Mons players
Vancouver Whitecaps FC players
Hatta Club players
UAE First Division League players
Belgian Pro League players
Challenger Pro League players
Expatriate footballers in Belgium
Expatriate soccer players in Canada
Major League Soccer players
Designated Players (MLS)
Association football forwards